Avendaño is a Spanish surname. It is believed to have originated in Galicia, then passed to the Basque Country, and later spread to other areas of Spain and Portugal as well as Latin America.

People
Notable people with the surname include:

 Dr. Diego Núñez de Avendaño, Peruvian 16th century judge and, briefly, viceroy of Peru
 Diego de Avendaño, Spanish-Peruvian 17th century Jesuit academic
 Fernando Avendaño, Peruvian 17th century priest
 Guillermo Flores Avendaño, President of Guatemala briefly in 1957-58
 Hugo Avendaño, Mexican singer and actor
 Jorge Avendaño, Mexican pianist, composer, songwriter and music producer
 Juan Avendaño, Spanish tennis player
 Juan Pablo Avendaño, Argentine footballer
 Manuel Avendaño, Chilean footballer
 Nazareth Avendaño, Costa Rican diplomat
 Pedro de Avendaño, Spanish conquistador
 Pedro Medina Avendaño, Colombian poet
 Serafín Avendaño, Spanish painter
 Víctor Avendaño, Argentine boxer
 Justin Avendano, Cricketer

Fictional characters
Fictional or fictionalized characters with the name include:
 The Avendaño brothers of the 2017 Netflix and Univision series, El Chapo, based on the real-life drug lords of the Tijuana drug cartel (a.k.a. the Arellano-Félix Organization):
 Benjamín Arellano Félix
 Ramón Arellano Félix

References

Surnames